Asana is an archaeological site by the Asana River, a tributary of the Osmore River, in the south-central Andes of southern Peru. Asana was occupied over the course of 8,000 years; though the inhabitants were initially mobile foragers, long term habitation was marked at a later phase by residential architecture.

Geography
Asana is located on the north bank of the Asana River in the flat fertile valley along  of the river. The geological and geomorphological features are causative factors for its unique setting.

History
An archaeological study of the Asana river valley was conducted 1986–89.

Human habitation has been traced to 10,500 BP at Asana. Excavations have revealed six stratigraphic zones from 10,500 BP to 3500 BP, before the site became abandoned in 3500 BP. The period from 10,500 BP to 9,000 BP is interpreted as belonging to the Late Pleistocene age, 800 years prior to any type of permanent habitation in other areas of the south central Andean highlands. During the settlement period, guanaco (Lama guanicoe) and taruka (Hippocamelus antisensis) were the local wild herbivores. Over the centuries, the guanaco were domesticated. The Asana at the lower elevation had formed the base camp of the earliest settlers who were hunter gatherers, hunting guanaco and taruca. Up to 5000 BP, settlement became more permanent. The gradual change from forager over to the pastoral society was recorded between 4800 and 4400 BP. By Middle Halocene age, guanacos had been domesticated. If these limits increased then they would establish new camps. Human settlement abruptly ended at Asana.

Archaeological finds

Lithic material found at the site attests to the shifting of camps and supports links existing between the settlements of the lower and upper elevations. Both residential and non-residential structures were found and indicated a complex type of growth and occupancy. Structure were dated between 5500–3600 BP. A ceremonial structure was found in an open air pre-ceramic site during excavations conducted from 1989–90. It is inferred that activities occurred at the ceremonial site during a 250–500-year period; it is the earliest structure noted of the Kotosh Religious Tradition. A feature identified as a "dance ground", dated to 4800 BP, was thought to be used for "feasts and social exchanges".

References

Bibliography

Archaeological sites in Moquegua Region
Archaeological sites in Peru
Andean preceramic
High-altitude archaeology
1980s archaeological discoveries
9th-millennium BC establishments
2nd-millennium BC disestablishments